Dawson Junior / Senior High School is a public school based in Dawson, Texas. Dawson Junior / Senior High School serves southwestern Navarro County.

Notable alumni
Anjanette Comer, actress

References

External links
Dawson ISD

Schools in Navarro County, Texas
Public high schools in Texas